Azygophleps nubilosa is a moth in the family Cossidae. It is found in Uganda, Tanzania and South Africa.

References

Moths described in 1910
Azygophleps
Insects of Uganda
Moths of Africa